Caleb Roark (born January 13, 1993) is an American professional stock car racing driver.

Racing career

Early career
Born in Abingdon, Virginia,

Nationwide Series
On May 16, 2014, Roark made his Nationwide Series debut at the Iowa Speedway. Roark partnered up with the now closed Viva Motorsports and earned himself a 32nd-place finish after dropping out of the race due to a vibration.

Camping World Truck Series
Roark made his NASCAR debut at the Martinsville Speedway in 2011 for SS-Green Light Racing in the No. 07 Chevrolet. After starting 32nd, Roark would gain 13 positions to finish 19th and earn his best career finish in any NASCAR start. After Roark's strong run at Martinsville, Roark made two more starts with the team in 2011 at the Iowa Speedway and Chicagoland Speedway to finish 24th and 22nd within the 36 trucks in the lineup. Roark only attempted two truck series races in the next two seasons for SS-Green Light Racing before leaving the team at the end of the 2013 season.

2014
After two seasons of minimal NASCAR participation, fellow Truck Series competitor Jennifer Jo Cobb had offered Roark a ride in the No. 0 Grimes Irrigation & Construction Chevrolet for a 10-race deal. His debut with Jennifer Jo Cobb Racing came at Gateway Motorsports Park where Roark started and finished in the 31st position after dropping out of the race from a vibration. Roark was unable to complete a race in 2014 while start and parking.

2015
Cobb kept Roark in the No. 0 for the 2015 season with new sponsorship from the Driven2Honor.org and shared the ride with Adam Edwards, who is also a part-time NASCAR Camping World Truck Series driver. Roark's season started out disappointing with three consecutive last place finishes, including failing to qualify at the Dover International Speedway and being swapped out at Gateway by Edwards. While start and parking, Roark had a best finish of 28th at the Michigan International Speedway. He continued to complete more laps in 2015 as the season came to a close giving him a total of $85,026 by the end of the year, nearly $2,000 more than 2014.

2016
It was announced at the start of the 2016 season that Jennifer Jo Cobb would not be running Roark's iconic No. 0 for future races, leaving Roark without a ride. He would remain a free agent until Cobb sold the No. 10 truck to Roark in which he would continue his start and park efforts with Jennifer Jo Cobb Racing.

On September 24, during the first lap of the UNOH 175 from the New Hampshire Motor Speedway, Roark was attempting to pull onto pit road to park his truck when he spun into the sand barrels that protects the butt-end of the wall, damaging the truck. Roark also competed in 7 more races throughout the season with his last being at Las Vegas.

Motorsports career results

NASCAR
(key) (Bold – Pole position awarded by qualifying time. Italics – Pole position earned by points standings or practice time. * – Most laps led.)

Nationwide Series

Camping World Truck Series

 Season still in progress
 Ineligible for series points

References

External links
 

1993 births
Living people
NASCAR drivers
People from Abingdon, Virginia
Racing drivers from Virginia